Namgyal Lhamu (born 5 April 1974), is an archer who internationally represented Bhutan.

Lhamu competed for Bhutan at the 1992 Summer Olympics in Barcelona. She finished 61st in the individual event, and the Bhutanese women's team finished 17th.

References

External links
 

1974 births
Living people
Olympic archers of Bhutan
Archers at the 1992 Summer Olympics
Bhutanese female archers